State Route 268 (SR 268) is a  southwest–northeast state highway located in the south-central part of the U.S. state of Georgia. It travels within portions of Coffee and Jeff Davis counties.

Route description
There is no section of SR 268 that is included as a part of the National Highway System.

SR 268 begins at an intersection with SR 32 southeast of Ambrose. The route heads north-northeast and curves to the northeast to enter Ambrose. There, it crosses a Seaboard Coast Line railroad. It heads northeast, crosses the Seventeen Mile River, and intersects SR 206 (Bowens Mill Road). Farther to the northeast is Broxton, where it has a brief concurrency with US 441/SR 31 along Alabama Street. Northeast of Broxton, the route enters Jeff Davis County, and meets its eastern terminus, an intersection with SR 107 in Snipesville.

History
SR 268 was established in 1950, with the part from SR 32 to Ambrose being paved. In 1957, a section from Broxton just to the northeast was paved. By 1960, the road was paved from its western terminus to just northeast of the Coffee-Jeff Davis County line. Also, the road was extended to Hazlehurst. By 1988, the road's eastern terminus was truncated to Snipesville, where it is today.

Major intersections

See also

References

External links

 

268
Transportation in Coffee County, Georgia
Transportation in Jeff Davis County, Georgia